I'll Always Love You may refer to:

 I'll Always Love You (album), a 1979 album by Anne Murray
"I'll Always Love You", a 1950 single by Dean Martin
 "I'll Always Love You" (The Spinners song), 1965
 "I'll Always Love You" (Michael Johnson song), 1979
 "I'll Always Love You" (Taylor Dayne song), 1988
 I'll Always Love You, a children's book by Hans Wilhelm

See also
 I Will Always Love You (disambiguation)
 "I'll Always Be In Love With You", a song by Morton Downey popularized by Kay Starr, also covered by Jack Pleis and by the Beatles